Have a Good Time is the 11th studio album by soul singer Al Green, released in 1976.

Track listing
All tracks composed by Al Green and Willie Mitchell; except where indicated
Side one
 "Keep Me Cryin'" – 3:08
 "Smile a Little Bit More" – 2:53
 "I Tried to Tell Myself" – 3:28
 "Something" – 4:24
 "The Truth Marches On" – 2:42

Side two
 "Have a Good Time" (Green) – 3:38
 "Nothing Takes the Place of You" (Toussaint McCall, Alan Robinson) – 4:39
 "Happy" – 2:40
 "Hold on Forever" (Green) – 2:38

Personnel
Al Green: vocals
Charles Chalmers, Donna Rhodes, Sandra Rhodes: backing vocals
Mabon "Teenie" Hodges: guitars
Michael Hodges, Michael Toles: guitars, sitar
Michael Allen, James H. Brown, Archie Turner: piano
Charles Hodges: organ
Leroy Hodges: bass
Gene Chrisman, Howard Grimes: drums, percussion
Lewis Collins, Bill Easley - tenor saxophone
Andrew Love - alto saxophone
James Mitchell: baritone saxophone
Jack Hale, Jr., Wayne Jackson: trumpet
Jack Hale, Sr., Jackie Thomas: trombone
The Memphis Strings - strings
Strings & Horns arranged by Willie Mitchell & Aarion Nesbit

References 

Al Green albums
1976 albums
Albums produced by Willie Mitchell (musician)
The Right Stuff Records albums